Arctosirenites is a genus of extinct ceratitid ammonoids from the Triassic of British Columbia and Nunavut, Canada, included in the Trachyceratidae.

References 

 Arctoserinites Paleodb

Trachyceratidae
Ceratitida genera
Triassic ammonites
Fossils of British Columbia